WWKS (96.1 FM, "Kiss 96") is a radio station licensed to serve Charlotte Amalie, U.S. Virgin Islands. The station is owned by Gordon P. Ackley through GARK LLC. It airs an Urban Adult Contemporary music format.

Ownership
In May 2007, WIVI was sold by Rox Radio Enterprises Inc. (Jason Ackley, president, CEO) to Gordon P. Ackley. Rox Radio, 60% owned by Gordon Ackley, assigned WIVI to GARK LLC, which is 100% owned by Ackley, for a reported $300,000.

References

External links
 Ackley Media Group
 

WKS
Urban adult contemporary radio stations
Radio stations established in 1988
1988 establishments in the United States Virgin Islands
Charlotte Amalie, U.S. Virgin Islands
Adult contemporary radio stations in insular areas of the United States